The Muslim Public Affairs Council (MPAC) is a national American Muslim advocacy and public policy organization headquartered in Los Angeles and with offices in Washington, D.C. MPAC was founded in 1988.

According to the organization's website, MPAC seeks to correct misperceptions and improve public understanding and policies that affect American Muslims by engaging directly with key members of the government, media and local communities. The group has been criticized within mainstream American Islam for taking charity in violation of the Quran and for joining an Amicus Brief in the Gerald Lynn Bostock v. Clayton County, Georgia case.

History
The Muslim Public Affairs Council (MPAC) was founded in 1988 at the Islamic Center of Southern California."

In its history, it has condemned the death fatwa against Salman Rushdie and the attacks on the World Trade Center, and denounced the Taliban and Osama bin Laden.

In January 2023, MPAC issued a statement defending a professor who was fired from Hamline University in Minnesota for showing a painting of Muhammad in an art class.

See also
Anti-Defamation League
Council on American–Islamic Relations

References

External links

Political advocacy groups in the United States
Religious activism
Civic and political organizations of the United States
Islamic organizations based in the United States
Organizations based in Los Angeles
Organizations established in 1986
1986 establishments in California